Strawberry flavor may refer to:

 Ethyl methylphenylglycidate, an ingredient in some artificial strawberry flavorings
 Real strawberry flavor